Francis Howard Greenway (20 November 1777 – September 1837) was an English-born architect who was transported to Australia as a convict for the crime of forgery. In New South Wales he worked for the Governor, Lachlan Macquarie, as Australia's first government architect. He became widely known and admired for his work displayed in buildings such as St Matthew's Church, St James' Church and Hyde Park Barracks.

Life and career
Greenway was born in Mangotsfield, Gloucestershire (near the English city of Bristol), the son of Francis Greenway and Ann Webb. Greenway became an architect "of some eminence" in Bristol and Bath. His only remaining building in the United Kingdom is the Clifton Club in Bristol, originally the Clifton Hotel and Assembly Rooms.  In 1809 he became bankrupt and in 1812 he pleaded guilty "under the advice of his friends", to forging a financial document, and was sentenced to death; this sentence was later commuted to 14 years' transportation. Why he pleaded guilty is unknown; he may have been told it was the only way to save his life. Whilst awaiting deportation to Sydney, Greenway spent time in Newgate Prison, Bristol, where he completed paintings depicting scenes within the prison.

Greenway arrived in Sydney, New South Wales on the transport General Hewitt in February 1814 to serve his sentence. On board the ship was the surgeon Dr John Harris who was to give Greenway his first private commission in the colony which involved extending his residence on his Ultimo estate. Greenway first met Lachlan Macquarie in July 1814 to whom he had come recommended by Admiral Arthur Phillip. During the initial meeting Macquarie sought to test Greenway by asking him to copy a design of a town hall and courthouse from a pattern book. Greenway was so offended by this that he responded with a letter declaring his skills and quoting Sir William Chambers that Macquarie should utilise the opportunity for a classical design, saying he would "immediately copy the drawing Your Excellency requested me to do, notwithstanding it is rather painful to my mind as a professional man to copy a building that has no claim to classical proportion and character."

Between 1816 and 1818, while still a convict, Greenway was responsible for the design and construction of the Macquarie Lighthouse on the South Head 2km from the entrance to Port Jackson. After the success of this project he was emancipated by the governor Lachlan Macquarie, before breakfast on 16 December 1817 at the Lighthouse. In the role of Acting Civil Architect and Assistant Engineer responsible to Captain J. M. Gill, Inspector of Public Works, went on to build many significant buildings in the new colony.

Greenway’s works include Hyde Park Barracks, extensions to First Government House, the stables for a projected new Government House (condemned for their ‘useless magnificence’ by a visiting British official, the building is now home to the Sydney Conservatorium of Music), and St James' Church, Sydney, which was chosen as one of Australia’s only two man-made ‘treasures’ by Dan Cruickshank in the BBC series Around the World in 80 Treasures. He submitted designs for the first Catholic church in Sydney, St Mary's but they did not match the ambitious scale envisaged by the priest Fr Therry, and were not proceeded with.

Greenway fell into disrepute when Macquarie accused him of charging high fees whilst on a government retainer, and he was dismissed by the next governor, Thomas Brisbane, in 1822. He continued to follow his profession with little success.

In 1835 he was destitute, advertising in the Sydney Gazette that "Francis Howard Greenway, arising from circumstances of a singular nature is induced again to solicit the patronage of his friends and the public".

Greenway died of typhoid near Newcastle, New South Wales in 1837, aged 59. The exact date of his death is not known. He is believed to have been buried in the Glebe burial ground at East Maitland on 25 September 1837, but his grave is unmarked.

Posthumous tributes

Ironically, despite conviction for the forgery of a financial document, Greenway's face was shown on the first Australian decimal-currency $10 note (1966–93), making him probably the only convicted forger in the world to be honoured on a banknote.

Greenway is the eponym of a NSW Federal electorate, a suburb of Canberra, and a high school in Woodberry, a suburb of Maitland.

Francis Greenway Drive in the suburb of Cherrybrook is named in honour of Francis Greenway.

The Vaucluse home of the renowned Australian architect Leslie Wilkinson (1882–1973) was named ’Greenway’ in honour of Francis Greenway.

A Correctional Centre complex near Windsor, NSW is called the Francis Greenway Complex.

Selected list of works

The following works were either designed by Greenway, or where he had significant influence:

See also
 List of convicts transported to Australia
 History of Sydney

References

Notes

Citations

Sources 

 
 Dictionary of Australian Artists Online
 Francis Greenway Drive

External links 
 

1777 births
1837 deaths
New South Wales architects
English emigrants to Australia
Australian public servants
Convicts transported to Australia
People from Mangotsfield
Maitland, New South Wales
People from Clifton, Bristol
Burials in New South Wales